Peter J. Ungaro (born 1969) is an American businessman and was CEO of Cray.

Education
Ungaro received his undergraduate degree from Washington State University in 1991.

Career
After college Ungaro joined IBM, where he became vice president for worldwide deep computing sales, in what was then the IBM HPC group. Ungaro joined Cray in August 2003 as vice president of sales and marketing. In 2005, he was appointed president and then CEO.  Ungaro joined Hewlett Packard Enterprise in 2019, after HPE acquired Cray.  He announced his intention to leave HPE in April, 2021.

References 

Living people
American computer businesspeople
American technology chief executives
Washington State University alumni
1969 births
IBM employees